Christi is a feminine given name. Notable people with the name include:

 Christi Belcourt (born 1966), Métis painter, craftsperson, and writer
 Christi Brereton (born 1992), English kickboxer and muay Thai fighter
 Christi Lake (born 1965), American pornographic actress
 Christi Malthouse (born 1976), Australian television personality
 Christi Paul (born 1969), American television journalist
 Christi Shake (born 1980), American model and actress
 Christi Thomas (born 1982), American basketball player

See also
 Christ (disambiguation)
 Christa (disambiguation)
 Christe
 Christie (disambiguation)
 Christo (disambiguation)
 Christy (disambiguation)
 Cristi (name)
 Kristi (disambiguation)

Feminine given names